Philip C Hubble (born 19 July 1960) is an English former butterfly swimmer.

Swimming career

Olympic Games
Hubble represented Great Britain and competed in events at the 1980 and 1984 Olympic Games, winning the silver medal in 1980 in the men's 200-metre butterfly.

Commonwealth Games
He won seven medals at the Commonwealth Games. In 1978 he represented England and won two bronze medals in the 100 metres butterfly and 4 x 200 metres freestyle relay, at the 1978 Commonwealth Games in Edmonton, Alberta, Canada. Four years later he won five more medals when representing England at the 1982 Commonwealth Games in Brisbane, Queensland, Australia, the medals consisted of a gold medal in the 200 metres butterfly, and four silver medals in the 100 metres butterfly, the 4 x 100 metres freestyle relay, the 4 x 200 metres freestyle relay and the 4 x 100 metres medley relay.

National Championships
He is a two times winner of the ASA National Championship 200 metres freestyle title (1980 and 1983), two times winner of the 100 metres butterfly title (1980 and 1982) and a five times winner of the 200 metres butterfly (1976, 1978, 1980, 1982 and 1983).

See also
 List of Commonwealth Games medallists in swimming (men)
 List of Olympic medalists in swimming (men)

References

 sports-reference
 British Olympic Association Athlete Profile

1960 births
Living people
People from Beaconsfield
English male swimmers
Male butterfly swimmers
Olympic swimmers of Great Britain
Swimmers at the 1980 Summer Olympics
Swimmers at the 1984 Summer Olympics
Swimmers at the 1978 Commonwealth Games
Swimmers at the 1982 Commonwealth Games
Commonwealth Games gold medallists for England
Commonwealth Games silver medallists for England
Commonwealth Games bronze medallists for England
European Aquatics Championships medalists in swimming
People educated at Upton Court Grammar School
Medalists at the 1980 Summer Olympics
Olympic silver medallists for Great Britain
Olympic silver medalists in swimming
Commonwealth Games medallists in swimming
Universiade medalists in swimming
Universiade silver medalists for Great Britain
Medalists at the 1983 Summer Universiade
Medallists at the 1978 Commonwealth Games
Medallists at the 1982 Commonwealth Games